Philip Dodd may refer to:

 Philip Dodd (author) (born 1957), author, editor and publishing consultant
 Philip Dodd (broadcaster) (born 1949), broadcaster, writer and editor
 Philip Stanhope Dodd (1775–1852), Church of England clergyman
 Philip Dodd (actor), Australian actor

See also
 Phil Dodds (1951–2007), audio engineer